This is a list of members of the Council of the German Cultural Community between 1995 and 1999, following the direct elections of 1995.

Composition

Sources
 

List
1990s in Belgium